The women's 10 metre platform competition of the diving events at the 2011 World Aquatics Championships was held on July 20 with the preliminary round held in the morning and the semifinal in the evening session. The final was held on July 21.

Medalists

Results
The preliminary round was held on July 20 at 10:00. The semifinal was held on the same day at 14:00. The final was held on July 21 at 17:15.

Green denotes finalists

Blue denotes semifinalists

References

External links
2011 World Aquatics Championships: Women's 10 m platform start list, from OmegaTiming.com; retrieved 2011-07-17.

Women's 10 m platform
Aqua